Wait Till You See Her is an album by jazz guitarist John Abercrombie with violinist Mark Feldman, bassist Thomas Morgan, and drummer Joey Baron that was recorded in 2008 and released by ECM in 2009.

Reception
The Allmusic review by Michael G. Nastos awarded the album 3½ stars, stating, "John Abercrombie's longstanding partnership with Mark Feldman has yielded several albums of exquisite music, and Wait Till You See Her is no different. The mood is naturally restrained, contemplative, and introspective as you would expect, while there's a common thread of healthy respect that keeps the quartet in the softer mezzo piano range... At the bottom line, it's another consistent and at times excellent effort from these tried and true modern musicians".

Track listing

Personnel
 John Abercrombie – guitar
 Mark Feldman – violin
 Thomas Morgan – double bass
 Joey Baron – drums

References

ECM Records albums
John Abercrombie (guitarist) albums
2009 albums
Albums produced by Manfred Eicher